Noorpur railway station 
() is in Pakistan.

Nearby : Chak No. 373 J.B Perewal

See also
 List of railway stations in Pakistan
 Pakistan Railways

References

Railway stations in Toba Tek Singh District